Primera División de México (Mexican First Division) Verano 2001 is a Mexican football tournament - one of two short tournaments that take up the entire year to determine the champion(s) of Mexican football. It began on Saturday, January 6, 2001, and ran until April 19, when the regular season ended. In the final Santos Laguna defeated Pachuca and became champions for the second time.

Overview

Final standings (groups)

League table

Results

Top goalscorers 
Players sorted first by goals scored, then by last name. Only regular season goals listed.

Source: MedioTiempo

Playoffs

Repechage

Puebla won 5–4 on aggregate.

4–4 on aggregate. UAG advanced for being the higher seeded team.

Bracket

Quarterfinals

Santos Laguna won 7–2 on aggregate.

Puebla won 5–3 on aggregate.

América won 5–2 on aggregate.

Pachuca won 6–2 on aggregate.

Semifinals

6–6 on aggregate. Santos Laguna advanced for being the higher seeded team.

Pachuca won 3–1 on aggregate.

Finals

Santos Laguna won 4–3 on aggregate.

Relegation

Relegation table

Relegation playoff
Because the Mexican soccer federation determined the expansion of the league from 18 to 20 teams in two seasons, Atlante, the relegated team, was offered the possibility of playing a promotion of relegation against Veracruz, best team in the Primera División 'A' season table, Atlante was required to pay a bail of 5 million dollars for the celebration of the games, however, this was never paid. Atlante won the playoff.

Atlante won 4-1 on aggregate.

References

External links
 Mediotiempo.com (where information was obtained)

Mexico
2000–01 in Mexican football
2001A